The women's triple jump competition of the athletics events at the 2019 Pan American Games took place on the 9 of August at the 2019 Pan American Games Athletics Stadium. The defending Pan American Games champion is Caterine Ibargüen from Colombia.

Summary
With Caterine Ibargüen not competing after participating in the long jump, Yulimar Rojas took the lead with her first jump that no the competitor would beat. Silver medalist Shanieka Ricketts displayed amazing consistency with three jumps within 1 cm of her best.

Records
Prior to this competition, the existing world and Pan American Games records were as follows:

Schedule

Results
All times shown are in meters.

Final
The results were as follows

References

Athletics at the 2019 Pan American Games
2019